Jeff Wallace Nordgaard  (born February 23, 1973) is an American-born naturalized Polish former professional basketball player.

Early life
Nordgaard's father, John Nordgaard, was a biology teacher and guidance counselor at Dawson-Boyd High School and at one time its head basketball coach. When playing basketball at Dawson-Boyd High School in 1990, as a junior, Jeff scored 41 points in an 86–78 win over Canby, to set a new team record. In 1991 he became the first player in Minnesota state history to achieve a quadruple double.

Basketball career
He played college basketball for the Green Bay Phoenix at the University of Wisconsin–Green Bay. He finished his college hoops career in March 1996 and in May was named "Basketball Man of the Year" in Wisconsin. Nordgaard was drafted by the Milwaukee Bucks in the second round of the 1996 NBA draft. He began his professional career in Europe, spending the 1996–97 season with two clubs, Dijon (France) and Patronato Bilbao (Spain 2nd). The following season he briefly played for the Bucks before finishing the season with the CBA's Fort Wayne Fury.

Nordgaard then returned to Europe, first going to Viola Reggio Calabria in Italy for the 1998–99 season, where he was a teammate of future NBA star Manu Ginóbili. The next season he returned to France with Besançon BCD. Nordgaard briefly returned to America in 2000 with the Indiana Legends in the ABA before signing a contract that brought him back to France with Chalon.

In 2001 Nordgaard went to Poland, joining Anwil Włocławek. He then moved to Polonia Warsaw in 2003. Nordgaard was especially well-traveled in the 2004–05 season, first returning to Italy to play for Roseto, transferring to Greek power Olympiacos, and ending the season back at Polonia. The following year he signed with another Polish club, Prokom Trefl Sopot, and stayed there through the 2006–07 season. Nordgaard moved to AZS Koszalin for the 2007–08 season and decided to stay for the 2008–09 season.

Personal life
During his time in Poland, Nordgaard took out Polish citizenship, and played for the Polish national team. On February 15, 2003, a son, Dawson John Nordgaard, was born to Jeff and Alexis Nordgaard.

References

External links
Career statistics
 Koszalin profile

1973 births
Living people
American emigrants to Poland
American expatriate basketball people in France
American expatriate basketball people in Greece
American expatriate basketball people in Italy
American expatriate basketball people in Poland
American expatriate basketball people in Spain
American men's basketball players
Asseco Gdynia players
AZS Koszalin players
Basketball players from Minnesota
Besançon BCD players
Fort Wayne Fury players
Green Bay Phoenix men's basketball players
JDA Dijon Basket players
KK Włocławek players
Milwaukee Bucks draft picks
Milwaukee Bucks players
Naturalized citizens of Poland
Olympiacos B.C. players
People from Dawson, Minnesota
Polish men's basketball players
Polonia Warszawa (basketball) players
Roseto Sharks players
Small forwards
Viola Reggio Calabria players